Tony Wayne Hunter (born May 22, 1960) is a former American football tight end in the National Football League (NFL) for the Buffalo Bills and the Los Angeles Rams. He was drafted out of the University of Notre Dame in the 1983 NFL Draft by the Bills, two picks ahead of Jim Kelly. His career was cut short due to a career ending leg injury.

External links
Career statistics

1960 births
Living people
Players of American football from Cincinnati
American football tight ends
Notre Dame Fighting Irish football players
Buffalo Bills players
Los Angeles Rams players